The FIFA World Cup is an international association football competition established in 1930. It is contested by the men's national teams of the members of Fédération Internationale de Football Association (FIFA), the sport's global governing body. The tournament has taken place every four years, except in 1942 and 1946, when the competition was cancelled due to World War II. 

The World Cup opening match is the first of the competition. Opening match regulations have changed many times. Between 1974 and 2002, the defending champions were involved in the opening match. Since 2006, as the defending champions no longer qualify automatically, the opening matches involve the host nations.

List of opening matches

Early years (1930–1970)

Defending champion era (1974–2002)

Host country era (2006–)

See also 
List of association football competitions
List of FIFA Confederations Cup finals
List of FIFA World Cup finals

References

External links

FIFA World Cup openings
Lists of FIFA World Cup matches
id:Daftar pertandingan pembukaan Piala Dunia FIFA